The general speed limits in Latvia are:

50 km/h on public roads within an urban area
80 km/h on gravel roads outside an urban area 
90 km/h on public roads outside an urban area
100-110 on some designated roads (only during March 1 – November 1)

Road traffic regulations also stipulate speed limits for motorways from 1 March till 1 December as 110 km/h (motorcycles, tricycles, quadricycles, passenger cars and heavy goods vehicles the laden mass of which does not exceed 7.5 t) and for buses - 100 km/h. But in fact, precisely no motorways or highways have been built in Latvia as of October 2020. There are plans to introduce those roads during before 2030–2040.

References

Latvia
Transport in Latvia